Axel Hamberg (17 January 1863 – 28 June 1933) was a Swedish mineralogist, geographer and explorer.

Biography

Hamberg was born in Stockholm, Sweden.
He was the son of Nils Peter Hamberg (1815-1902) and Emma Augusta Christina Härnström (1833-1914). Hamberg became a student at Uppsala University in 1881, philosophy candidate in 1888 and was awarded a  Licentiate degree in 1893. 

He became an associate professor of mineralogy and crystallography in the same year at Stockholm University. In 1907, he received his  philosophy doctor and was appointed as an extra ordinary professor at the University of Uppsala. He served as a professor in geography at Uppsala until 1928.

In 1883, he attended the expedition of Adolf Erik Nordenskiöld to Greenland and in 1898 accompanied  on the expedition of Alfred Nathorst  on the ship "Antarctic" to Svalbard and Kong Karls Land.

At the General Art and Industrial Exposition of Stockholm of 1897, he received a gold medal for an exhibition of Scandinavian minerals. 
He was elected a member of the Royal Swedish Academy of Sciences in 1905.  He was elected to membership by the Royal Society of Sciences in Uppsala in 1916 and by the Royal Physiographic Society in Lund in 1929. He held the presidency of the International Glacier Commission from 1913 until 1927.

Personal life
Hamberg was married in 1912 with Sigrid Charlotta Nordlund (1885-1959).  His wife was a  poet whose work appeared in such magazines  as Idun and Svea. Their son,  Per Gustaf Hamberg (1913-1978),  was a professor of art history and art theory at the University of Gothenburg.

Awards and honors
The Spitsbergen glacier Hambergbreen is named after him.

The Bjørnøya mountain of Hambergfjellet is named after him.

The Hamberg Glacier of South Georgia and the Hamberg Glacier of NE Greenland are named after him.

The mineral hambergite was named after him in 1890.

References

1863 births
1933 deaths
Scientists from Stockholm
Uppsala University alumni
Academic staff of Uppsala University
Swedish explorers
Swedish mineralogists
Swedish geographers
Members of the Royal Swedish Academy of Sciences
Members of the Royal Society of Sciences in Uppsala